Middle of Nowhere is a 2008 coming-of-age comedy-drama film directed by John Stockwell, written by Michelle Morgan, and starring Susan Sarandon and her real-life daughter, Eva Amurri. It premiered at the 2008 Toronto International Film Festival. The film received a Golden Trailer Awards nomination in the category of Best Music.

Plot
The film follows Grace (Eva Amurri), a young woman whose irresponsible mother, Rhonda (Susan Sarandon), ruins her daughter's credit rating. Rhonda uses the money to finance Grace's younger sister, Taylor's (Willa Holland), modeling campaign. While working a summer job, Grace meets the lonely Dorian Spitz (Anton Yelchin) and they start selling drugs together for extra cash. A love triangle forms when Dorian is attracted to Grace, who is interested in Ben Pretzler (Justin Chatwin).

Cast
Eva Amurri as Grace Berry
Susan Sarandon as Rhonda Berry
Anton Yelchin as Dorian Spitz 
Justin Chatwin as Ben Pretzler 
Willa Holland as Taylor Elizabeth Berry
Scott A Martin as Morris Kraven
Kenny Bordes as Ryan
Kyle Clements as Ted

Production
On May 14, 2007, it was announced that John Stockwell will direct the film, which has Eva Amurri and Susan Sarandon attached to star, principal photography set to begin in September. On July 10, 2007, Anton Yelchin, Justin Chatwin and Willa Holland joined the cast.

References

External links

2008 films
2000s coming-of-age comedy-drama films
American teen comedy-drama films
American coming-of-age comedy-drama films
2000s teen comedy-drama films
American independent films
Bold Films films
Films directed by John Stockwell
2008 independent films
2000s English-language films
2000s American films